Widowmaker was an American heavy metal band formed by Dee Snider in 1991 after the demise of his previous band, Desperado.

The line-up consisted of Snider and fellow former Desperado member Marc Russell on bass, drummer Joey Franco who had played on the final Twisted Sister album, Love Is for Suckers, and guitarist Al Pitrelli, fresh off his stint with Alice Cooper.

They recorded two albums and toured the country in support but ultimately disbanded. Dee Snider went on to a number of other projects, including a reunion of Twisted Sister.

Members
Dee Snider – vocals (1992–1994)
Al Pitrelli – guitars, keyboards, backing vocals (1992–1994)
Marc Russell – bass, backing vocals (1992–1994)
Joey Franco – drums (1992–1994)

Touring members
Freddy Villano - bass, backing vocals (1994)

Discography
Blood and Bullets (1992)
Stand by for Pain (1994)

References

American heavy metal musical groups